Government Secondary School, Eneka (GSS) is a coeducational public high school in Rivers State, Nigeria. It is located within Eneka, a town in Obio-Akpor local government area. The school began functioning in 1977, under founding principal Uchendu Achi. Since being established, the school has produced luminaries in the fields of medicine, engineering, law and other professions.

Notable alumni

 Worgu Boms, lawyer
 Ezenwo Nyesom Wike, current Governor of Rivers State

See also
List of schools in Port Harcourt

References

External links

Schools in Port Harcourt
Secondary schools in Rivers State
Government schools in Nigeria
Educational institutions established in 1977
1977 establishments in Nigeria